Wilson–Kuykendall Farm is a historic home located near Moorefield, Hardy County, West Virginia. It was built about 1870, and is a two-story, brick Greek Revival style dwelling. It also has Gothic and Italianate stylistic influences. It features a central roof tower with a "widows walk" flanked by paired chimney stacks.  Also on the property are a contributing frame carriage house with multiple gables and a barn.

It was listed on the National Register of Historic Places in 1985.

References

Houses on the National Register of Historic Places in West Virginia
Farms on the National Register of Historic Places in West Virginia
Greek Revival houses in West Virginia
Houses completed in 1870
Houses in Hardy County, West Virginia
National Register of Historic Places in Hardy County, West Virginia
Gothic Revival architecture in West Virginia
Italianate architecture in West Virginia
1870 establishments in West Virginia